Cantharellus altipes is a species of fungus in the family Cantharellaceae. Described as new to science in 2011, it is found in Texas, where it grows in oak-pine woods.

References

External links

altipes
Fungi of the United States
Natural history of Texas
Fungi described in 2011
Fungi without expected TNC conservation status